16volt is an American industrial rock band featuring Eric Powell, with other performers added for live shows.

History
16volt was formed in Portland, Oregon by composer and vocalist Eric Powell. Powell recruited musicians drummer Joel Bornzin, guitarist Jon Fell and Jeff Taylor to record "Motorskills", which debuted on The Cyberflesh Conspiracy various artist compilation by If It Moves... That band released their first full-length studio album Wisdom on May 25, 1993, after signing to Re-Constriction Records. The album received critical attention for its industrial-informed beats and abrasive electronic textures. The band continued to issue albums via Re-Constriction for the next three albums: Skin (1994), LetDownCrush (1996), and SuperCoolNothing (1998).

The band is featured in the opening scene of video game Primal, and contributed nine songs to the game's soundtrack.

16volt released its fifth album titled FullBlackHabit in 2007 for Metropolis Records. The band followed that release with two more studio albums for Metropolis, American Porn Songs and Beating Dead Horses, which were released in 2009 and 2011 respectively.  16volt self-released the 2016 album The Negative Space on their label Murder Creek. The EP Dead on Arrivals was self-released for Murder Creek in 2017.

Discography
Studio albums
 Wisdom (1993, Re-Constriction)
 Skin (1994, Re-Constriction)
 LetDownCrush (1996, Re-Constriction)
 SuperCoolNothing (1998, Re-Constriction)
 FullBlackHabit (2007, Metropolis)
 American Porn Songs (2009, Metropolis)
 Beating Dead Horses (2011, Metropolis)
 The Negative Space (2016, Murder Creek)

Remix albums
 The Remix Wars: Strike 3 – 16 Volt vs. Hate Dept (1996, 21st Circuitry)
 American Porn Songs: Remixed (2010, Metropolis)

Compilation albums
 Demography (2000, Cleopatra)
 SuperCoolNothing V2.0 (2002, Dark City Music)
 The Best of Sixteen Volt (2005, Cleopatra)

Extended plays
 Dead on Arrivals (2017, Murder Creek)

Singles
 "The Dreams That Rot in Your Heart" (1996, Re-Constriction)

References

External links 
 
 16volt at Bandcamp
 
 
 
 

Musical groups established in 1988
American industrial metal musical groups
American musical duos
21st Circuitry artists
Cleopatra Records artists
Metropolis Records artists
Re-Constriction Records artists
Musical groups from Portland, Oregon